Formosa Television is a television station based in New Taipei, Taiwan. Established on March 27, 1996, FTV began broadcasting on June 11, 1997.

Formosa Television is also the first free-to-air television station which was established without direct relationship with any political party and department of Taiwan government. Because of the location of its headquarters, which is in an area where Taiwanese Hokkien speakers are populous, it also earned the reputation for being the first station in Taiwan to use that tongue in a majority of its programs, especially on its prime time newscasts.

On May 24, 2004, FTV was among the first free-to-air channels in Taiwan to switch from terrestrial analog signal to digital television.

One of its more popular broadcasts are the coverage of live matches of the Chinese Professional Baseball League.

Around-the-clock broadcasting
Midnight on January 1, 2018 marked Formosa Television's first day of 24-hour broadcasting, as Uni-President Enterprises Corporation celebrated its fiftieth anniversary with a New Year's Eve countdown broadcast.

FTV Channels
FTV HD
FTV News
FTV One (formerly known as Follow Me TV)
FTV Taiwan
FTV Drama (Online-only; aired local drama series, mainly weeknight soaps)
FTV Variety (Online-only; aired local entertainment shows)
FTV Travel (Online-only; aired Travel and some Living shows)

See also
 List of Taiwanese television series
 Democratic Progressive Party

References

External links

 

1996 establishments in Taiwan
Television stations in Taiwan
Television channels and stations established in 1996
Chinese-language television stations
Companies based in Taipei
Mass media in Taipei
Entertainment companies of Taiwan